Frederick Charles Lind (1904–1976) was an Australian rugby league footballer who played in the 1920s.

Lind was born at Marrickville, New South Wales in 1904, and came through the Newtown juniors. He was graded in 1926 and played four seasons with the club between 1926 and 1930.

Lind died on 28 February 1976, aged 71 at Bateau Bay, New South Wales.

References

1904 births
1976 deaths
Australian rugby league players
Newtown Jets players
Rugby league fullbacks
Rugby league players from Sydney